The Men's Sabre Individual B wheelchair fencing competition at the 2004 Summer Paralympics was held on 22 September at the Helliniko Fencing Hall.

The event was won by Robert Wysmierski, representing .

Results

Preliminaries

Pool A

Pool B

Competition bracket

References

M